Arola may refer to:

Places
 Arola, a town in Piedmont, Italy

People
 Raimon Arola, a Spanish art historian and essayist
 Alfredo Arola Blanquet, a Spanish socialist politician

Companies
 Arola SARL, a French microcar manufacturer now part of the Aixam Group